Alexander Paul Föhr (born 1 August 1980) is a German politician from the Christian Democratic Union. Since 2023, he has been a Member of the German Bundestag from the state of Baden-Württemberg.

Biography 
Between 2001 and 2008 he studied political science, public law and history at the University of Mainz. He graduated with a master's degree. From 2008 to 2012 he worked in the department of Mayor  at the City of Heidelberg. Until he entered the Bundestag in 2023, he was Head of Communications and Politics at the AOK Baden-Württemberg .

Föhr is married, has three children and lives in Heidelberg.

Political career 
Foehr is a member of the CDU. He has been a member of the municipal council of Heidelberg since 2014. He has been the district chairman of the CDU in Heidelberg since 2015. He is also a member of the district board of the CDU Nordbaden.

Föhr ran as a candidate in the 2021 German federal election in the federal constituency of Heidelberg, but initially failed to get into the Bundestag. On 1 March 2023, he replaced Michael Hennrich in the Bundestag when he resigned.

External links 

 Website of Alexander Föhr
 Biography of Alexander Föhr on the website of the German Bundestag
 Alexander Föhr on abgeordnetenwatch.de

References 

1980 births
Christian Democratic Union of Germany politicians
People from Heidelberg
21st-century German politicians
Members of the Bundestag for Baden-Württemberg
Members of the Bundestag 2021–2025
Johannes Gutenberg University Mainz alumni
Living people